The Joseph Wilson House was a property in Franklin, Tennessee built in c.1861.  It was listed on the National Register of Historic Places in 1988. The house was destroyed by fire on August 30, 2016, and was subsequently removed from the National Register.

References

Houses on the National Register of Historic Places in Tennessee
Houses in Franklin, Tennessee
Greek Revival houses in Tennessee
Houses completed in 1861
1861 establishments in Tennessee
National Register of Historic Places in Williamson County, Tennessee
Former National Register of Historic Places in Tennessee